The largest development capital network in the province, the Fonds de solidarité FTQ was created on the initiative of the FTQ, Québec's largest central labour body.

As of November 30, 2022, the Fonds held $17.8 billion in net assets and had more than 753,000 owner-shareholders.

History

 1981 : Beginning of an economic crisis that would last 18 months and see business interest rates climb to 25%.
 1982 : Québec Summit: The FTQ looks for ways to save jobs. 
 June 1982 : Launch of the Corvée-Habitation project, a partnership between construction workers, unionized workers, businesses and governments that would save over 57,000 jobs during the three-year economic crisis and give homebuyers access to financing below the market rate. 
 September 1982 : Denis de Belleval writes 20-page report to propose creation of a 750 million dollar fund much like the one later proposed by FTQ.
 October 1982 : Closure of several plants in Sept-Îles that had been bought out by workers to save their jobs. Facing bankruptcy, workers not only lost their savings but their livelihoods as well.
 April 1983 : Louis Laberge convinces the FTQ General Council to create the Fonds in order to share the risk and make investments in SMEs in order to create and maintain jobs.
 June 1983 : The Fonds de solidarité FTQ is created through Bill 192. Louis Laberge declares, "The Fonds will be a profitable entity, not a charitable organization or a subsidy agency." 
 June 1983 : The Québec and federal governments each contribute $10 million to launch the Fonds. 
 December 1984 : The Fonds makes its first investment: $500,000 in Scierie des Outardes.
 January 1985 : The Fonds launches its first advertising campaign for its RRSP.
 February 23, 1985 : First Annual Meeting of Shareholders.
 1986 : Introduction of economic education for workers. 
 1990 : Creation of SOLIM, a real estate investment fund known today as Fonds immobilier de solidarité FTQ.
 1990 : The Fonds teams up with the Union des municipalités régionales de comté (UMRCQ) to create société en commandite SOLIDEQ, charged with creating the SOLIDES, today known as the Fonds locaux de solidarité FTQ [local solidarity funds].
 1996 : Creation of the Fonds régionaux de solidarité FTQ [regional solidarity funds].
 1997 : Raymond Bachand replaces Claude Blanchet as President and CEO. 
 1997 : Introduction of the Shareholder's Booklet. 
 1998 : The Fonds celebrates its 15th anniversary. 
 1999 : Henri Massé becomes President of the FTQ and Chairman of the Fonds. 
 2000 : Over 20% of Canada's venture capital is managed by the Fonds.
 2002 : Pierre Genest becomes President and CEO. 
 2002 : Net assets reach $4.5 billion.
 2002 : Shareholder base surpasses 500,000. 
 2005 : Québec's Department of Finance announces changes to the Fonds’ investment rules, allowing it to increase its investments in larger companies. 
 2006 : Yvon Bolduc takes over the helm at the Fonds.  
 2009 : The Fonds becomes a signatory to the United Nations Global Compact.
 2010 : The Fonds joins the Global Reporting Initiative (GRI).
 2017 : Net assets reach $13.7 billion.
 2018 : Net assets reach $14.8 billion. As at November 30, 2018
 2019 : Net assets reach $16.7 billion. As at November 30, 2019

 Network 

Headquartered in Montréal, the Fonds de solidarité FTQ has a network of independent organizations that includes 16 Fonds régionaux de solidarité FTQ [regional solidarity funds], 16 Fonds locaux de solidarité FTQ [local solidarity funds] and the Fonds immobilier de solidarité FTQ''' [real estate solidarity fund]. Its investment network also includes 77 specialty funds.

Constituting act 
The Fonds de solidarité FTQ was constituted on June 23, 1983 by an act of the Québec National Assembly, then headed by the René Lévesque government. The initial capital came from workers affiliated to FTQ that was complemented by provincial and federal governments.

60% rule 
In keeping with its mission, the Fonds makes investments in all types of businesses, with or without a guarantee. However, in any given year, the proportion of unsecured investments in eligible companies must represent, on average, at least 60% of its average net assets of the previous year.

Business financing  
For the last 5 years, the Fonds had invested an average of $771 million per year in Québec companies. It is a partner, either directly or through one of its network members, in over 2,839 Québec companies.

The only development capital organization with sector expertise, the Fonds invests in the most important sectors of the Québec economy.

Sector expertise  

The Fonds de solidarité FTQ specializes in 25 sectors of the Québec economy:
 Aerospace
 Agri-food
 Wood
 Chemical
 Construction and construction material
 Culture
 Distribution and consumer goods
 Social economy
 Environment
 Printing machinery and equipment
 Transportation equipment and automobiles
 Furniture and fixtures
 Mining
 Pulp and paper
 Plastics
 Metal products
 Leisure tourism
 Life sciences
 Business services
 Transportation services
 Financial services
 ICT
 Textiles
 Business transfers

RRSP 

Fonds shares, which are eligible for the Registered Retirement Savings Plan (RRSP), can be purchased by any Québec taxpayer either through payroll deduction – available in unionized companies or government organizations (an FTQ-affiliated or other union), – preauthorized withdrawals, or a lump sum payment. Anyone can purchase Fonds shares.

In its 36-year history, the Fonds has sold $16.7 billion in shares. The Fonds relies on a network of over 2,600 local representatives—unionized employees who promote the Fonds RRSP in their workplace.

Fonds shares are a popular investment because in addition to the tax benefits individuals obtain for buying an RRSP, they also receive two additional tax credits: 15% from each government (Québec and Canada) on the first $5,000 invested each year. Fonds shares cannot be sold before retirement except under certain conditions such as loss of employment, participation in the federal government's Home Buyers’ Plan, and disability.

References

Canadian Labour Congress
1983 establishments in Quebec
Venture capital firms of Canada
Institutional investors
Economy of Quebec